Luciano Marín Arango, aka "Iván Márquez" (born June 16, 1955) is a Colombian guerrilla leader, member of the Revolutionary Armed Forces of Colombia (FARC), part of its secretariat higher command and advisor to the Northwestern and Caribbean blocs. He was part of the FARC negotiators that concluded a peace agreement with the Colombian president Juan Manuel Santos. On 29 August 2019, Márquez abandoned the peace process and announced a renewed armed conflict with the Colombian government.

Early years
Marín Arango joined the Colombian Communist Party's youth wing in 1977. He later joined a support network for the FARC guerrilla group.

FARC membership
Luciano Marín Arango, adopting the alias "Iván Márquez", became a political commissar for FARC's 14th Front in 1985.

Patriotic Union career
As a result of peace talks with the Colombian government, Marín Arango became part of the leftist Patriotic Union (UP) party, coordinating the UP's activities in Department of Caqueta. Marín Arango first served as councilman and then as congressman in the Colombian Congress representing Caquetá.

The UP party was subjected to persecution by different paramilitary groups, drug lords and death squads that saw the party as a threat as the political branch of the FARC.

FARC commander
By 1988, Iván Márquez had left the UP and returned to FARC as block commander, overseeing activities in the departments of Huila, Caquetá and Putumayo.

After the 1990 death of Jacobo Arenas, Márquez joined the secretariat, the highest command of the organization. During the mid-1990s, he was transferred to Colombia's northwest in order to reorganize FARC forces after paramilitary attacks.

Recent documents obtained from the computer of slain FARC chieftain Iván Ríos revealed that he also led FARC's efforts to infiltrate universities and high schools. "Through the creation of two student federations, some academics and other secondary officials, and by the infiltration of already existing university movements" the FARC sought to penetrate centers of learning, [Colombian DAS intelligence director María del Pilar] Hurtado told Spanish news agency EFE. Colombian armed conflict.

FARC negotiator
Márquez was a FARC negotiator during the 1999–2002 failed peace process between the FARC and the government of Andrés Pastrana.

Humanitarian exchange

In November 2007 Márquez was sent to Venezuela to meet with Venezuelan President Hugo Chávez. At the time, Chavez was mediating between the government of Colombia and the FARC to agree on a deal to liberate the hostages held by the FARC and the liberation of some 500 guerrillas imprisoned by the government of Colombia, after years of combat in the Colombian armed conflict.

US State Department allegations and bounty
According to the US Department of State, Márquez oversaw loading of planes carrying 600–1200 kilograms of cocaine and the receipt of money and automatic weapons as payment. The state department also alleges that Márquez established the FARC's policies for directing and controlling the production, manufacture, and distribution of hundreds of tons of cocaine to the United States and the world ; the "taxation" of the drug trade in Colombia to raise funds for the FARC. The U.S. Department of State has offered a reward of up to $5 million for information leading to his arrest and/or conviction

References

External links

1955 births
Living people
People from Caquetá Department
Members of FARC
Colombian communists
Anti-revisionists